Laniel may refer to:

Places
 Laniel, Quebec, an unorganized territory in Quebec, Canada

People with the surname
 Gérald Laniel (1924–2016), Canadian politician
 Joseph Laniel (1889–1975), French politician
 Marc Laniel (born 1968), Canadian ice hockey player